Clywedog may refer to:

 Afon Clywedog, a tributary of the River Severn at Llanidloes
 River Clywedog, a tributary of River Dee near Wrexham
 A tributary of the Afon Wnion in Gwynedd
 Clywedog Reservoir, a reservoir in Powys
 River Clywedog, Denbigh, a tributary of the River Clwyd
 Clywedog Brook, Powys, a tributary of the Wye.

See also
Clydach (disambiguation)